Heterocubazomus is a monotypic genus of hubbardiid short-tailed whipscorpions, first described by Rolando Teruel in 2007. Its single species, Heterocubazomus sierramaestrae is distributed in Cuba.

References 

Schizomida genera
Monotypic arachnid genera